The Richardson L. Wright School was a school in the Nicetown–Tioga neighborhood in northern Philadelphia, Pennsylvania. It was designed by Lloyd Titus, the Chief Draftsman (1901–1905) of the Department of Buildings of the Philadelphia School Board.  He was the last non-architect to serve in the position.  The school building contained three stories in the Colonial Revival style with a hipped roof.  It was destroyed sometime before 2008 and replaced by ball courts.

The Richardson L. Wright School should not be confused with the Richard R. Wright School, which is currently operating in north Philadelphia.

References

External links
[ Photograph from the Pennsylvania Historic Resources Survey]

School buildings on the National Register of Historic Places in Philadelphia
Nicetown-Tioga, Philadelphia
1905 establishments in Pennsylvania